Sarojini is a feminine given name. Notable people with the name include:

 Sarojini Charles, Sri Lankan Tamil civil servant
 Sarojini Naidu (1879–1949), President of the Indian National Conference
 Sarojini Pillay (21st century), Fijian academic
 Sarojini Sahoo (born 1956), Indian feminist writer
 Sarojini Yogeswaran (died 1998), Sri Lankan politician

Feminine given names
Tamil feminine given names